East Richland Christian Schools is a private, coeducational Christian school in St. Clairsville, Ohio, United States.  ERCS currently resides on the campus of the East Richland Evangelical Friends Church which provides the school oversight. Athletic teams compete as the East Richland Lions in the Ohio Christian School Athletic Association.

The school is well known in the area for its performance in STEM subjects and recently was awarded a Thomas Edison Awards for Excellence in STEM Education.

Background
East Richland Christian Schools was formed by the merger of New Covenant Academy and Faith Community Christian High School in 2009. The school continues to pursue a building program. The school offers many extra-curricular activities including junior high and varsity sports, speech, choir, band, math, science, and drama. A new elementary building was constructed in 2011 to house pre-school through 6th grade. In 2010, a modular classroom was purchased for additional high school classroom space.

References

External links
East Richland Christian Schools website

Christian schools in Ohio
Educational institutions established in 2009
High schools in Belmont County, Ohio
Private high schools in Ohio
Private middle schools in Ohio
Private elementary schools in Ohio
2009 establishments in Ohio